Kay Frances Meredith ( Huggins, February 26, 1936 – November 14, 2022) was an American equestrian and writer. Meredith was born in West Virginia and lived in Raleigh, North Carolina. She represented the United States at numerous international dressage competitions and became National Grand Prix Champion in 1982. In 1979, she was named the American Horse Show Association Horsewoman of the Year.

As a founding member of the United States Dressage Federation, Meredith served as the second USDF Vice President before she served as the President from 1977 to 1982. In 2004 the Roemer Foundation placed Kay Meredith into the USDF Hall of Fame by honoring her with their prestigious Lifetime Achievement Award.

Meredith was born in Wood County, West Virginia. She died in a hospice in Raleigh, North Carolina, on November 14, 2022, at the age of 86.

References

External links
 Kay Meredith's Web site
 
 

1936 births
2022 deaths
21st-century American women
People from Wood County, West Virginia
Writers from West Virginia
American female equestrians
Equestrians at the 1983 Pan American Games
Pan American Games gold medalists for the United States
Pan American Games medalists in equestrian
Medalists at the 1983 Pan American Games